Nilpenia rossi is an Ediacaran sediment feeder.
With a 30  diameter, it is considered to represent the largest (by area) Ediacaran organism.

See also
List of Ediacaran genera

References

Ediacaran life
Precambrian fossils
Fossil taxa described in 2014